Horden is a village in the Maidstone district of Kent, England. His Majesty's Prison Blantyre House is located at Horden. The population is included in the civil parish of Goudhurst.

External links

Villages in Kent